John R. Cumpson (August 30, 1866March 15, 1913) was an American stage and film actor. On Broadway, he appeared in Up York State in 1901. With regard to his screen career, Cumpson appeared in at least 124 films between 1905 and 1912. A 1910 newspaper item described him as "the famous Swedish dialect comedian."

Silent film star Florence Lawrence enjoyed working often with Cumpson at the Biograph Company in 1908 and 1909, although later, in an interview with Photoplay, she described him as essentially a humorless comedian:

Cumpson died of pneumonia and diabetes at Washington Heights Hospital in New York City. He was survived by a brother and two sisters.

Selected filmography

References

External links

Male actors from New York (state)
American male film actors
American male silent film actors
American male stage actors
Deaths from diabetes
Deaths from pneumonia in New York City
Male actors from Buffalo, New York
1866 births
1913 deaths
20th-century American male actors